Brad McCormick Weber (born 17 January 1991) is a New Zealand rugby union player, who currently plays as a halfback for  in the National Provincial Championship and the  in Super Rugby.

Early life
Brother of Napier Marist rugby player Sam Weber and son of Neil Weber. Brad attended St Patrick's school in Napier before moving to Napier Boys’ High School for his secondary school education.
Brad played his junior rugby for Napier Old Boys’ Marist and was selected into the Napier Ross Shield team in 2003.

Career
After moving to Dunedin he joined the Dunedin Rugby Football Club (Inc) 'The Sharks' Established in 1871 playing firstly for the Premier Colts side in 2010 and then the Senior Premier side in 2011. He was in the Hawkes Bay ITM side in that year. He played for Dunedin in 2012 and was in the Senior Premier side that were runners up for the Premier Banner. In 2013 the Dunedin Premier side won the Premier 1 Dunedin Metropolitan Club Championship and the club named him Speight's Premier Player of the year. Weber has still referenced his playing days with the 'Sharks' with a 'Fins Up' salute after he has scored for his current team.
 
Weber started his senior career playing for the  Razorbacks while studying for an applied science degree at the University of Otago. He made nine appearances during the 2012 ITM Cup, but could not dislodge Fumiaki Tanaka as first choice half-back.

2013 did not start well for him as rising-star Josh Renton was named ahead of him in the Dunedin team's ITM Cup squad and he began to focus more on his studies than rugby. However, a month into the season he received a call from  coach Johnny Walters who wanted to take him north to provide more competition for halfbacks Mick Snowden and Kylem O'Donnell. His switch was more successful than he could have imagined as a series of good performances saw him named in the  wider training group ahead of the 2014 Super Rugby season.   Tawera Kerr-Barlow and Augustine Pulu were selected as the defending champions first-choice halfbacks; however, an injury to Kerr-Barlow prior to the season opener against the  opened the door for Weber, who made his Super Rugby debut as a second-half substitute in an 18-10 win for the Chiefs.

Weber was named captain of the Waikato ITM Cup squad for the 2014 ITM Cup season. and co-captain with Whetu Douglas for the 2015 ITM Cup season.

At the end of the 2015 ITM Cup season, after scoring a second half hat trick in the final match against Hawke's Bay to win the Ranfurly Shield for Waikato, it was announced that Weber had signed a contract to return to Napier to play for Hawke's Bay for the 2016 ITM Cup season.

International career
Weber was a member of the New Zealand Under 20 side that won the 2011 IRB Junior World Championship in Italy.   He largely served as back up to TJ Perenara during the competition.

Weber made his All Blacks debut against Samoa on 8 July 2015.
On October 2, 2019, during the 2019 Rugby World Cup in Japan, Weber scored his first international try in a pool match against Canada. He scored a second in the same match.

References

External links
 

New Zealand rugby union players
New Zealand international rugby union players
Rugby union scrum-halves
Otago rugby union players
Waikato rugby union players
Chiefs (rugby union) players
1991 births
Living people
Rugby union players from Napier, New Zealand
People educated at Napier Boys' High School
Māori All Blacks players
Hawke's Bay rugby union players